A list of films produced in France in 1989.

References

External links
 1989 in France
 French films of 1989 at the Internet Movie Database
French films of 1989 at Cinema-francais.fr

1989
Films
Lists of 1989 films by country or language